Anthony Norman Albanese (  or  ; born 2 March 1963) is an Australian politician serving as the 31st and current prime minister of Australia since 2022. He has been leader of the Australian Labor Party (ALP) since 2019 and the member of parliament (MP) for Grayndler since 1996. Albanese previously was the 15th deputy prime minister under the second Kevin Rudd government in 2013; he held various ministerial positions in the governments of Kevin Rudd and Julia Gillard from 2007 to 2013.

Albanese was born in Sydney to an Italian father and an Irish-Australian mother who raised him as a single parent. He attended St Mary's Cathedral College before going on to the University of Sydney to study economics. He joined the Labor Party as a student, and before entering Parliament worked as a party official and research officer. Albanese was elected to the House of Representatives at the 1996 election, winning the seat of Grayndler in New South Wales. He was first appointed to the shadow cabinet in 2001 by Simon Crean and went on to serve in a number of roles, eventually becoming Manager of Opposition Business in 2006. After Labor's victory in the 2007 election, Albanese was appointed Leader of the House, and was also made Minister for Regional Development and Local Government and Minister for Infrastructure and Transport. In the subsequent leadership tensions between Kevin Rudd and Julia Gillard from 2010 to 2013, Albanese was publicly critical of the conduct of both, calling for party unity. After supporting Rudd in the final leadership ballot between the two in June 2013, Albanese was elected the deputy leader of the Labor Party and sworn in as deputy prime minister the following day, a position he held for less than three months, as Labor was defeated at the 2013 election.

After Rudd resigned the leadership and retired from politics, Albanese stood against Bill Shorten in the ensuing leadership election, the first to include party members in addition to MPs. Although Albanese won a large majority of the membership, Shorten won more heavily among Labor MPs and won the contest; Shorten subsequently appointed Albanese to his Shadow Cabinet. After Labor's surprise defeat in the 2019 election, Shorten resigned as leader, with Albanese becoming the only person nominated in the leadership election to replace him; he was subsequently elected unopposed as leader of the Labor Party, becoming Leader of the Opposition.

In the 2022 election, Albanese led his party to a decisive victory against Scott Morrison's Liberal-National Coalition. Albanese is the first Italian-Australian to become prime minister, the first Australian prime minister to have a non-Anglo-Celtic surname, and is the last of the 16 Australian prime ministers who have served under Queen Elizabeth II. He was sworn in on 23 May 2022, alongside four senior frontbench colleagues. Albanese's first acts as prime minister included updating Australia's climate targets in an effort to reach carbon neutrality by 2050, and supporting an increase to the national minimum wage. His government legislated a national anti-corruption commission, and made major changes to Australian labour law. In foreign policy, Albanese pledged further logistical support to Ukraine to assist with the Russo-Ukrainian war, has attempted to strengthen relations in the Pacific region, and held a high-level meeting with Chinese president Xi Jinping, ending a diplomatic freeze between Australia and China.

Early life

Family and background 
Albanese was born on 2 March 1963 at St Margaret's Hospital in the Sydney suburb of Darlinghurst. He is the son of Carlo Albanese and Maryanne Ellery. His mother was an Australian of Irish descent, while his Italian father was from Barletta in Apulia. The Italian surname Albanese is in reference to the Arbëreshë people, ethnic Albanians indigenous to the part of southern Italy where Albanese's father came from. His parents met in March 1962 on a voyage from Sydney to Southampton, England, on the Sitmar Line's TSS Fairsky, where his father worked as a steward, but did not continue their relationship afterwards, going their separate ways. Coincidentally, the Fairsky was also the ship on which Albanese's future parliamentary colleague Julia Gillard and her family migrated to South Australia from the United Kingdom in 1966.

Growing up, Albanese was told that his father had died in a car accident; he did not meet his father, who was in fact still alive, until 2009, tracking him down initially with the assistance of John Faulkner, Carnival Australia's CEO Ann Sherry (the parent company of P&O, which acquired the Sitmar Line in 1988) and maritime historian Rob Henderson, and then later the Australian Embassy in Italy and ambassador Amanda Vanstone. He made contact with his father in 2009, visiting him a number of times in Italy, and he took his family there as well. His father died in 2014. He subsequently discovered that he had two half-siblings. During the Australian parliamentary eligibility crisis of 2017, it was noted that, although birth to an Italian father would ordinarily confer citizenship by descent, Albanese had no father recorded on his birth certificate and thus meets the parliamentary eligibility requirements of section 44 of the constitution.

Albanese's maternal grandfather George Ellery ran a printing business on William Street in Darlinghurst. He provided printing services to the ALP.

Childhood and education 
Albanese grew up with his mother and maternal grandparents in a Sydney City Council home in the Inner West suburb of Camperdown, opposite the Camperdown Children's Hospital. His grandfather died in 1970, and the following year his mother married James Williamson. He was given his stepfather's surname, but the marriage lasted only 10 weeks, as Williamson proved to be an abusive alcoholic. Albanese's mother worked part-time as a cleaner but suffered from chronic rheumatoid arthritis, with the family surviving on her disability pension and his grandmother's age pension.

Albanese attended St Joseph's Primary School in Camperdown and then St Mary's Cathedral College. After finishing school, he worked for the Commonwealth Bank for two years before studying economics at the University of Sydney. There, he became involved in student politics and was elected to the Students' Representative Council. It was also there where he started his rise as a key player in the ALP's Labor Left. During his time in student politics, Albanese led a group within Young Labor that was aligned with the left faction's Hard Left, which maintained "links with broader left-wing groups, such as the Communist Party of Australia, People for Nuclear Disarmament and the African National Congress".

Albanese's mother died in 2002.

Pre-parliamentary career and travel 
After completing his economics degree in 1984, Albanese took on a role as a research officer to the then Minister for Local Government and Administrative Services, Tom Uren, who became a mentor to him. In 1989, the position of Assistant General Secretary of the New South Wales branch of the Labor Party became vacant when John Faulkner was elected to the Senate. The election to replace him was closely disputed between the Labor Left's Hard Left and Soft Left groupings, with Albanese being elected with the backing of the Hard Left, taking on that role for the next six years. In 1995, he left the position to work as a senior adviser to New South Wales Premier Bob Carr.

Albanese's first overseas trip was in 1986, accompanying his friend Jeremy Fisher to Vanuatu. In 1987, Albanese joined his boss Tom Uren on a visit to South-East Asia, which included: a meeting of the United Nations Economic and Social Commission for Asia and the Pacific in Bangkok, Thailand; an Anzac Day dawn service at the Kanchanaburi War Cemetery with John Carrick; and a tour of Cambodia alongside Bill Hayden's daughter Ingrid. He then travelled extensively in 1988, visiting Zimbabwe, Zambia, Botswana, Western Europe on a Contiki tour, and Eastern Europe and Scandinavia as a backpacker. Upon returning to Australia, he began dating Carmel Tebbutt, with whom he would holiday in Europe and South-East Asia, plus a backpacking trip to India in 1991. Sometime during his 20s, Albanese also took part in a tour of the United States organised by the State Department, with a thematic focus on the interaction of advocacy groups with the U.S. Government.

In 1990, Albanese bought a semi-detached two-bedroom house in the Inner West Sydney suburb of Marrickville.

Early political career

Entry to Parliament 

When Jeannette McHugh announced she would not recontest her seat of Grayndler at the 1996 election, Albanese won preselection for the seat. The campaign was a difficult one, with aircraft noise a big political issue following the opening of the third runway at Sydney Airport, and the newly established No Aircraft Noise party (NAN) having polled strongly in the local area at the 1995 New South Wales election. Veteran political pundit Malcolm Mackerras predicted NAN would win the seat. However, NAN's candidate finished third, with less than 14% of the vote. Despite suffering a six-point swing against Labor, Albanese was elected with a comfortable 16-point margin.

In his maiden speech to the House of Representatives, he spoke about the building of a third runway at Sydney Airport, aircraft noise and the need to build a second airport to service Sydney, as well as his support for funding public infrastructure in general, multiculturalism, native title, the social wage and childcare. He concluded by saying, "For myself, I will be satisfied if I can be remembered as someone who will stand up for the interests of my electorate, for working-class people, for the labour movement, and for our progressive advancement as a nation into the next century."

In his first year in Parliament he continued this theme, speaking in favour of the Northern Territory's euthanasia legislation, the rights of the Indigenous community in the Hindmarsh Island bridge controversy, and entitlement to superannuation for same-sex couples.

This latter issue became a cause to which he was particularly dedicated. In 1998 he unsuccessfully moved a private member's bill that would have given same-sex couples the same rights to superannuation as de facto heterosexual couples. Over the next nine years, he tried three more times without success, until the election of the Rudd Government in 2007 saw the legislation passed. Albanese subsequently turned his attention to campaigning for same-sex marriage.

Appointment to Shadow Cabinet 

In 1998, Albanese was appointed a parliamentary secretary, a position which assists ministers and shadow ministers and is often a stepping stone to a full ministerial position.

In 2001, he was promoted to the opposition Shadow Cabinet, taking the portfolio of ageing and seniors. A 2002 reshuffle saw him become Shadow Minister for Employment Services and Training, and in 2004 he became Shadow Minister for Environment and Heritage. It was during this latter role that then prime minister John Howard and science minister Brendan Nelson started raising the idea of nuclear power for Australia. Albanese campaigned strongly against them, as well as elements within his own party, arguing that "Nuclear energy doesn't add up economically, environmentally or socially, and after more than 50 years of debate, we still do not have an answer to nuclear proliferation or nuclear waste."

In 2005, he was given the additional role of Shadow Minister for Water alongside his existing responsibilities, and was also appointed Deputy Manager of Opposition Business in the House. In December 2006, when Kevin Rudd first became Leader of the Labor Party, Albanese took over from Julia Gillard as Manager of Opposition Business in the House, a senior tactical role on the floor of the parliament, and was appointed Shadow Minister for Water and Infrastructure.

Cabinet minister

Rudd government 
Following Labor's victory at the 2007 election, Albanese's rise in standing within the party was evidenced by his appointment as Minister for Infrastructure and Transport, Minister for Regional Development and Local Government and Leader of the House of Representatives in the Rudd ministry. Rudd was sworn in alongside his colleagues on 3 December 2007.

The Labor Party had gone to the election criticising the previous government for ignoring "long-term nation building in favour of short-term political spending". One of Albanese's first moves as Minister for Infrastructure and Transport was the establishment of an independent statutory body, Infrastructure Australia, to advise the Government on infrastructure priorities. Armed with advice from this independent body and his own persuasive skills in the Cabinet, he was able to argue for a doubling of the roads budget and a tenfold increase in rail investment. The establishment of Infrastructure Australia was regarded by many as a success; projects delivered through the Infrastructure Australia process included Melbourne's Regional Rail Link, the Hunter Expressway, the Ipswich Motorway, the Gold Coast light rail system G:link, the Redcliffe Peninsula railway line, the extension of the Noarlunga Centre railway line to Seaford, South Australia and various projects along the Pacific Highway in NSW and Bruce Highway in Queensland.

Gillard government 

After Julia Gillard replaced Rudd as prime minister following the leadership spill in June 2010 she retained Albanese in his roles. Following the 2010 election, which resulted in a hung parliament, Albanese was a key player in negotiating the support of independent members Tony Windsor and Rob Oakeshott through his role of Leader of the House. Albanese was also responsible for managing legislation through the House in the first hung parliament since the 1940s.

In 2011, Albanese introduced two more major policy reforms. The first on urban planning drew on the work of Danish designer Jan Gehl and set out plans for urban design with better transport links and safety. The second, on shipping, was notable for gaining the approval of both the conservative Australian Shipowners Associations and the radical Maritime Union of Australia. However, he also attracted controversy when a convoy of trucks from North Queensland dubbed the "convoy of no confidence" descended on Canberra's Parliament House to protest against rising fuel costs and carbon pricing. During question time, Albanese labelled the protesters outside as "the convoy of no consequence".

Following a series of poor polls, leadership instability descended again on the Labor Government. Former prime minister Kevin Rudd resigned as Minister for Foreign Affairs in February 2012 to unsuccessfully challenge Julia Gillard for the leadership. Shortly before the ballot, Albanese came out in support of Rudd, stating that he had always been unhappy with the manner of Rudd's removal. He tearfully explained how he had offered his resignation as Leader of the House to the prime minister, but that she had refused to accept it, and called on Labor to cease leadership divisions and unify. In response to a question on his personal feelings around the leadership spill, he stated "I like fighting Tories. That's what I do."

Deputy Prime Minister of Australia 

In June 2013, Rudd defeated Gillard in a final leadership election. That same ballot saw Albanese elected by the caucus as Deputy Leader of the Labor Party, and the following day Albanese was sworn in as deputy prime minister. He held this role until Labor's defeat at the 2013 election, and was replaced by Warren Truss on 18 September.

Return to Opposition

2013 leadership election 
Following the defeat of Labor at the 2013 election, Albanese announced his candidacy to be Leader of the Labor Party, standing against Bill Shorten. Shorten was announced as the winner after a month-long contest that was the first to involve a combined vote of MPs and rank-and-file members. Although Albanese won comfortably among party members, Shorten held a greater lead among MPs, and was subsequently elected.

Shorten Opposition 
In October 2013, shortly after the leadership election, Shorten appointed Albanese Shadow Minister for Infrastructure and Transport and Shadow Minister for Tourism; he held these roles throughout Shorten's time as leader. In September 2014, Albanese was given the additional role of Shadow Minister for Cities.

Leader of the Opposition (2019–2022)

2019 leadership election 
Bill Shorten announced his resignation as Leader of the Labor Party on 18 May 2019, following Labor's unexpected defeat in the 2019 election. The day after, Albanese announced his candidacy in the subsequent leadership election. On 21 May, Chris Bowen announced he would also contest the ballot; however, the next day, he announced his withdrawal, citing his lack of support among the party membership. With no other candidate stepping forward, Albanese took the leadership unopposed on 30 May, with Richard Marles as his deputy. Aged 56 when he took office, he became the oldest first-time Opposition Leader in 59 years, since Arthur Calwell (aged 63) took office in 1960. Albanese unveiled his shadow ministry on 1 June 2019.

2022 federal election 
Albanese led the Labor Party into the 2022 federal election. On the first day of campaigning, Albanese was unable to name either the official cash rate or unemployment rate, which drew criticism. On 20 April, Albanese faced prime minister Scott Morrison in a debate hosted by Sky News, with Albanese being deemed the winner through an audience vote. However, the next day, Albanese tested positive for COVID-19, forcing him to isolate at home in Sydney. He returned to campaigning the following week and, on 1 May, hosted Labor's campaign launch in Perth which was the first time any major party launched in Western Australia. At the launch, Labor unveiled policies to reduce the cost of medicine and childcare, increase manufacturing in Australia, and introduce a shared equity housing scheme to assist first-time home buyers. Albanese faced Morrison in two further debates, hosted by Channel Nine and Channel Seven, respectively. Opinion polling indicated that support for the two major parties would reach record lows, due to high levels of support for third parties and independent candidates. However, unlike his predecessor, Albanese was able to ultimately able to lead the Labor Party to federal victory, defeating Prime Minister Scott Morrison and his government with a one seat majority in the House of Representatives.

Prime Minister of Australia (2022–present) 

Labor was victorious over the incumbent Liberal-National Coalition at the federal election on 21 May 2022, with Albanese becoming the 31st prime minister of Australia. Despite a fall in the party's primary vote, Labor won a number of seats from the Coalition, helped by a particularly large swing to the party in Western Australia; the result was also assisted by a number of "teal independents" winning seats from "moderate" Liberal members. 

Although it was not certain that Labor would win a majority, it soon became apparent that no other party could realistically form a government. Accordingly, two days after the election, Albanese, deputy leader Richard Marles, former shadow treasurer Jim Chalmers, and senators Penny Wong and Katy Gallagher were sworn in as an interim five-person ministry. According to Australia's ABC News, the Governor-General, David Hurley, would not have sworn in Albanese without assurances that Labor could provide stable government, as well as legal advice that this was the proper course of action. Albanese is the first Italian-Australian prime minister in the country's history. 

Albanese secured confidence and supply from several crossbenchers in the event that he was unable to form majority government. However, on 30 May, it was projected that Labor had won at least 76 seats, enough to win a majority for the first time at the federal level since the 2007 election. Albanese's full ministry was sworn in on 1 June.

Domestic affairs

Climate change 
On 16 June 2022, Albanese submitted a new Nationally Determined Contribution to the United Nations which formally committed Australia to reducing carbon emissions by 43% on 2005 levels. This represented an increase from the 26 to 28% target under the previous government. In September 2022, the Albanese government passed legislation to write this climate target into law. Albanese's government also entered a bid for Australia and its Pacific island neighbours to host the 2024 United Nations Climate Change conference.

Minimum wage 
On 27 May 2022, Albanese sent correspondence to the Fair Work Commission confirming that his government would seek to make a submission to the Commission in support of an increase to the minimum wage. The government announced that a submission had been formally made to the Commission on 3 June 2022 and that a "deliberate" policy of lower wages was not the policy of the new government. The Fair Work Commission subsequently announced on 15 June 2022 that the minimum wage would be raised by 5.2%.

National anti-corruption commission 
During the 2022 election campaign, Albanese pledged to establish a national anti-corruption commission, saying that it would be one of his "first priorities". On 27 September, attorney-general Mark Dreyfus introduced the relevant legislation to Parliament. The bill passed on 30 November 2022 in line with Albanese's commitment to legislate an anti-corruption commission prior to the end of the calendar year.

Indigenous affairs 
In his victory speech, Albanese expressed his support for the Uluru Statement from the Heart, and stated that his government would implement it in full within its first term. He has pledged to release a referendum, which if successful, will enshrine an Indigenous Voice to Parliament to assist the government with Indigenous issues, and recognise Indigenous Australians in Australia's constitution.

Industrial relations 
The government passed new workplace harassment laws through the Parliament on 28 November 2022. The news laws are in line with Albanese's promise to implement the recommendations of the Respect@Work Report by creating a positive duty requiring employers to implement measures to prevent sexual harassment.

On 2 December 2022, the government's Secure Jobs, Better Pay bill passed the Parliament. Under the new laws, unions can now negotiate multi-employer pay deals in an effort to secure wage increases across particular sectors such as child care and aged care. The law also aims to close the gender pay gap by prohibiting pay secrecy employment clauses and secures the right of workers to seek flexible working arrangements.

International affairs 

Albanese took his first international trip on 23 May 2022 immediately after being sworn in as prime minister when he flew to Tokyo to attend a Quadrilateral Security Dialogue meeting with fellow world leaders: US president Joe Biden, Indian prime minister Narendra Modi and Japanese prime minister Fumio Kishida. At the meeting, Albanese committed his new government to the goals of the Quad and confirmed that his government would seek to take stronger action in reducing carbon emissions. On 5 June, Albanese and Penny Wong visited Indonesian president Joko Widodo in Jakarta to develop Australia–Indonesia relations. Albanese said he would not "publicly intervene" to prevent WikiLeaks founder Julian Assange from being extradited to the United States.

Later in June, Albanese attended the 2022 NATO Madrid summit to discuss security threats facing the Pacific region. On 30 June, Albanese met with French president Emmanuel Macron in Paris to "reset" Australia–France relations, which had been damaged following the cancellation of a submarine deal by the preceding government. The next day, Albanese travelled to Ukraine to meet with president Volodymyr Zelenskyy, making him the first Australian prime minister to make a diplomatic visit to Ukraine. Albanese pledged a further $100 million in aid to assist with the ongoing Russo-Ukrainian War.

On 26 September 2022, Albanese travelled to Japan to attend the state funeral of former prime minister Shinzo Abe.

The relationship between Australia and China started to improve since Albanese became prime minister. In November 2022, Albanese held a bilateral meeting with Chinese leader Xi Jinping, bringing an end to the longest diplomatic freeze in 50 years between Australia and China. In early 2023, China ended its unofficial ban on imports of Australian coal, with all restrictions reportedly being lifted by 14 March.

In February 2023, Albanese hosted his New Zealand counterpart Chris Hipkins, who undertook his first state visit. While the two leaders reaffirmed Australian-New Zealand bilateral relations, they also discussed the controversial Section 501 deportation policy. Albanese confirmed that his government would amend the deportation policy to take into account individuals' connections to Australia and the length of time they had lived in the country.

Political views 
Albanese has described his political views as progressive, and is aligned with the Labor Left faction.

Albanese is a republican, and supports replacing Australia's current constitutional monarchy. In a debate to mark the Queen's Platinum Jubilee, he told the Australian Parliament, "Even many Australians who do not hold with the principle of monarchy feel regard for her. You can be a republican, as I am, and still have the deepest respect for the Queen. She has done her duty with fidelity, integrity, humanity and, as she sometimes lets slip, a sly sense of humour." He has stated his desire to give constitutional recognition to Indigenous Australians, and pledged to hold a referendum regarding an Indigenous Voice to Parliament upon becoming prime minister.

Social issues 

Albanese supports abortion rights, stating in an interview in August 2019 that he believes "women do have a right to choose". He is also in favour of legalising voluntary euthanasia. Albanese is a supporter and advocate for LGBT rights, and often participates in the annual Sydney Gay and Lesbian Mardi Gras. When Labor Party members were granted a conscience vote on the Marriage Amendment Bill 2012, which would have legalised same-sex marriage in Australia, Albanese voted in favour of the bill, which was unsuccessful. He opposed holding a plebiscite for same-sex marriage, stating that "we shouldn't be having a public vote where we get to judge other families". In 2017, Albanese also voted in favour of the Marriage Amendment (Definition and Religious Freedoms) Act 2017, the bill which ultimately legalised same-sex marriage.

Early in his political career, Albanese supported drug decriminalisation, telling Parliament in 1997 that "drug use by individuals is a health issue, not a criminal issue". However, in February 2022, he declined to commit to decriminalisation of hard drugs, commenting that the "current settings are appropriate".

In July 2015, Albanese stated his opposition to the government's policy of turning back asylum seekers who arrive to the country via boat, saying: "I couldn't ask someone else to do something that I couldn't see myself doing ... if people were in a boat including families and children, I myself couldn't turn that around." During the 2022 federal election campaign, Albanese clarified that boat turnbacks would be incorporated into his government's policy, leading to some critics accusing him of "flip-flopping" on the issue. In August 2021, after the Taliban seized control of Afghanistan, Albanese urged the Morrison government to give Afghan refugees permanent residency in Australia.

Environmental issues 
While serving in the Gillard government, Albanese supported the introduction of carbon pricing, and voted, along with the rest of the Labor Party, to establish the Clean Energy Act 2011, which instituted a carbon pricing scheme in Australia. After the Abbott government abolished the scheme in July 2014, Albanese stated that carbon pricing was no longer needed, as "the circumstances have changed".

Albanese is a prominent backer of renewable energy in Australia and has declared that the country's "long-term future lies in renewable energy sources". Upon his election in 2022, he said he would "end the climate wars" and mitigation and policies to address climate change in Australia would be a priority for his government, in contrast with those preceding it.

Foreign policy 

In February 2003, he criticized the planned US-led invasion of Iraq, saying that "Whatever criticisms can be made of the Iraqi regime, Islamic fundamentalism is not one of them. This is one of the reasons the United States supported Saddam Hussein in the 1980s, including supplying his regime with weapons of mass destruction, which he then used against both the Iranians and the Kurds."

Albanese's views on the Israeli–Palestinian conflict have shifted over the years. During the 2014 Gaza War, he called Israel's bombardment of the Gaza Strip a "collective punishment" that was "completely unacceptable". In 2018, he challenged a decision by the Australian government to vote against a UN human rights council motion calling for an investigation into the killings of Palestinian protesters during the Great March of Return. Shortly before the 2022 election, however, Albanese told The Australian Jewish News that any decision he takes on Israel-Palestine will contribute "to a peaceful resolution of the conflict and to progress towards a two-state solution". When asked about a 2018 resolution to recognise the State of Palestine, Albanese insisted the motion "has no greater or lesser weight" than it did previously. In October 2022, his government reversed the Morrison government's decision to recognise West Jerusalem as Israel's capital.

In February 2022, Albanese condemned Russia's invasion of Ukraine, remarking in a press release that it was a "grave moment for humanity".

In May 2022, Albanese said Australia's relationship with China would remain "a difficult one". He said that "Australia values human rights. We have spoken out about the treatment of Uyghurs, about what's occurred in Hong Kong, about Taiwan, about other minorities including in Tibet, that are suffering from human rights abuses."

Personal life 
In 2000, Albanese married Carmel Tebbutt, a future Deputy Premier of New South Wales. They had met in Young Labor during the late 1980s, and have one son together. The two separated in January 2019. In June 2020, it was reported that Albanese was in a relationship with Jodie Haydon. Albanese said they had met at a dinner event in Melbourne a year after his separation from Tebbutt. Albanese is the first divorcé to be appointed prime minister.

Albanese describes himself as "half-Italian and half-Irish" and a "non-practising Catholic". He is also a music fan who, not long after becoming prime minister, attended a Gang of Youths concert at the Enmore Theatre and previously intervened as transport minister to save a Dolly Parton tour from bureaucratic red tape. In 2013, he co-hosted a pre-election special of music program Rage and his song selection included the Pixies, the Pogues, the Smiths, the Triffids, PJ Harvey, Nirvana, Hunters & Collectors and Joy Division.

As a lifelong supporter of the South Sydney Rabbitohs rugby league club, he was a board member of the club from 1999 to 2002 and influential in the fight to have the club readmitted to the National Rugby League (NRL) competition. During October 2009, The Sydney Morning Herald reported that Albanese had opposed an attempt to appoint the former Liberal prime minister John Howard to a senior position in the NRL. Albanese stated he had phoned the NRL chief executive, David Gallop, as well as other league officials, to advise them against the idea. He then implored officials at Souths to help stop the suggestion from gaining momentum. In 2013, he was made a life member of the club.

Albanese was injured in a side collision while driving in Marrickville, New South Wales, on 8 January 2021. He underwent treatment at Royal Prince Alfred Hospital and was reportedly "injured externally and internally and had suffered considerable shock in the immediate aftermath of the impact". The other driver was a 17-year-old who received a ticket for negligent driving. Emergency workers told Albanese that if the teen's car had hit just 30 centimetres either side of where it did, Albanese "would almost certainly have been killed". Shortly following this accident, Albanese lost over 18 kilograms (39 pounds) by cutting out carbohydrates and reducing his alcohol intake, in an effort to be "match fit" for his election campaign.

See also 
 First Rudd Ministry (2007–2010)
 First Gillard Ministry (June–September 2010)
 Second Gillard Ministry (2010–2013)
 Second Rudd Ministry (June–September 2013)
 Shadow Ministry of Anthony Albanese (2019–2022)
 Albanese Ministry (2022–present)

Notes

References

Bibliography

External links 

 
 

|-

|-

|-

|-

|-

 
1963 births
20th-century Australian politicians
21st-century Australian politicians
Australian Labor Party members of the Parliament of Australia
Australian people of Irish descent
Australian politicians of Italian descent
Australian republicans
Australian Roman Catholics
Deputy Prime Ministers of Australia
Gillard Government
Government ministers of Australia
Labor Left politicians
Leaders of the Australian House of Representatives
Leaders of the Australian Labor Party
Living people
Members of the Australian House of Representatives
Members of the Australian House of Representatives for Grayndler
Members of the Cabinet of Australia
Politicians from Sydney
Australian Leaders of the Opposition
Prime Ministers of Australia
Rudd Government
Spouses of Australian politicians
University of Sydney alumni